The following is a List of Urdu-language poets.

13th century

15th century

16th century

17th century

18th century

 Mirza Muhammad Rafi, Sauda (1713–1780)
 Siraj Aurangabadi, Siraj (1715–1763)
Mohammad Meer Soz Dehlvi, Soz (1720-1799)
 Khwaja Mir Dard, Dard (1721–1785)
 Qayem Chandpuri, Muhammad Qyamuddin Ali Qayem (1722–1793)
 Mir Taqi Mir, Mir (1723–1810)
 Nazeer Akbarabadi, Nazeer (1740–1830)
 Qalandar Bakhsh Jurat, Jurat (1748–1810)
 Mashafi Shaikh Ghulam Hamdani, Mas'hafi (1750–1824)
 Insha Allah Khan 'Insha', Insha (1756–1817)
 Saadat Yaar Khan Rangin, Rangin (1757–1835)
 Bahadur Shah, Zafar (1775–1862)
 Imam Baksh Nasikh, Nasikh (1776–1838)
 Khwaja Haidar Ali Atish, Atish (1778–1846)
 Muhammad Ibrahim Khan, Zauq (1789–1854)
 Mirza Asadullah Khan Ghalib, Ghalib (1797–1869)

19th century
 Momin Khan Momin, Momin (1801–1852)
 Mirza Salaamat Ali Dabeer (Mirza Salaamat Ali), Dabeer (1803–1875)
 Mir Babar Ali Anis, Anis (1803–1874)
 Daya Shankar Kaul Nasim (1811–1845)
 Amir Meenai, Amir (1828–1900) 
 Dagh Dehlvi (Nawab Mirza Khan), Daagh (1831–1905)
 Altaf Hussain Hali (Hali Panipati), Hali (1837–1914)
 Akbar Allahabadi (Syed Akbar Hussain), Akbar (1846–1921)
 Ahmed Raza Khan Barelvi (Maulana Ahmed Raza Khan Barelvi), Raza (1856–1921)
 Hassan Raza Khan Barelvi (Maulana Hassan Raza Khan Barelvi), Hassan (1859-1908)
 Bekhud Badayuni (Muhammad Abdul-Hayy Siddiqui), Bekhud (1857–1912)
 Shibli Nomani (Allama Shibli Nomani). Shibli (1857–1914)
 Muztar Khairabadi (1862–1927)
 Alam (1868–1937)
 Zaigham (d. 1869)
 Tashna (1872–1931)
 Zafar Ali Khan (1873–1956)
 Syed Ghulam Bhik Nairang (1875–1952)
 Hasrat Mohani (Syed Fazlul Hussain), Hasrat (1875–1951)
 Dil Shahjahanpuri (Zameer Hasan Khan), Dil (1875–1959)
 Allama Muhammad Iqbal (Allama Iqbal), Iqbal (1877–1938)
 Mohammad Ali Jauhar (Maulana Jauhar), Jauhar (1878-1931)
 Fani Badayuni (Shaukat Ali Khan), Fani (1879–1941)
 Seemab Akbarabadi (Ashiq Hussain) (1882–1951)
 Brij Narayan Chakbast (1882–1926)
 Bekhud Dehlvi (Syed Wahiduddin Ahmed) (1882–1955)
 Niaz Fatehpuri (Maulana Niyaz Muhammad Khan) (1882–1966)
 Yagana Changezi (Mirza Wajid Hussain Yaas) Yaas (1883–1956)
 Josh Malsiyani (Labhu Ram) Josh (1883–1976)
 Asghar Gondvi (Asghar Hussain Asghar), Asghar (1884-1936)
 Tilok Chand Mehroom (1887–1966)
 Qamar Jalalvi (1887–1968)
 Amjad Hyderabadi (Amjad Hussain), Amjad (1888-1961)
 Jigar Moradabadi (Ali Sikandar), Jigar (1890–1960)
 Raaz Chandpuri (Mohd. Sadiq) (1892–1969)
 Hakim Ahmad Shuja (1893–1969)
 Josh Malihabadi (Shabbir Hassan Khan), Josh (1894–1982)
 Muhammad Mustafa Jauhar, Jauhar (1895– 1985)
 Firaq Gorakhpuri (Raghupati Sahay), Firaq (1896–1982)
 Ram Prasad Bismil (1897–1927)
 Abr Ahasani Gunnauri (Ahmed Baksh) Abr (1897–1973)
 Munavvar Lakhnavi Bisheshwar Prasad Munavvar (1897–1970)
 Abdur Rauf Urooj (c. 19321990)

1900
 Maghfoor Ahmad Ajazi (1900–1966) 
 Hafeez Jalandhari (Mohd.Hafeez), Hafeez (1900–1982)
 Talib Chakwali Manohar Lal Kapur ‘Talib’ (1900–1988)
 Pandit Harichand Akhtar ('Akhtar') (1901–1958)
 Alam Muzaffarnagari (Muhammad Ishaaq) (1901–1969)
 Bismil Saeedi (1901–1977)
 Khushtar Girami (Dewan Ram Rakhamal Kalia) (1902–1988)
 Anand Narain Mulla (1901–1997)
 Zaheen Shah Taji (1902–1978)
 Syed Sajjad Zaheer (1904–1973)
 Zulfiqar Ali Bukhari (1904–1975)
 Akhtar Sheerani (Mohd.Dawood Khan) (1905–1948)
 Saghar Nizami (1905–1984)
 Abid Ali Abid (1906–1971) 
 Gopal Mittal (1906–1993)
 Ratan Pandoravi (Rala Ram), Ratan (1907–1998)
 Makhdum Muhiuddin (1908–1969)
 Arsh Malsiani (Bal Mukund) (1908–1979)
 Majaz (Asrar-ul-Haq), Majaz (1909–1955)
 Abdul Hamid Adam (1909–1981)
 Sayyid Ahmedullah Qadri, Lisan ul Mulk(1909–1985)
 Kunwar Mohinder Singh Bedi Sahar, Sahar (1909-1998)

1910
 Noon Meem Rashid (1910–1975)
 Faiz Ahmed Faiz, Faiz (1911–1984)
 Syed Faiz-ul Hassan Shah (1911–1984)
 Aijaz Siddiqi (1911–1978)
 Ravish Siddiqi (Ravish) (1911–1971)
 Nushoor Wahidi (1911–1981)
 Meeraji (1912–1949)
 Shifa Gwaliori (1912–1968)
 Shamim Karhani (1913–1975)
 Mehr Lal Soni Zia Fatehabadi (1913–1986)
 Dr. Rafiq Hussain (1913–1990)
 Sahir Hoshiarpuri (1913–1994)
 Ali Sardar Jafri (1913–2000)
 Raza Naqvi Wahi (1914–2002)
 Mir Gul Khan Nasir (1914–1983)
 Rais Amrohvi (1914–1988)
 Ehsan Danish (1914–1982)
 Jan Nisar Akhtar (1914–1976)
 Majeed Amjad (1914–1974)
 Sikandar Ali Wajd (1914–1983)
 Akhtar ul Iman (1915–1996)
 Ahmed Nadeem Qasmi, Nadeem (1916–2006)
 Zamir Jafri, Zamir (1916–1999)
 Shakeel Badayuni (1916–1970)
 Agha Shorish Kashmiri (Agha Abdul Kareem) Shorish (1917–1975)
 Shan-ul-Haq Haqqee (1917–2005)
 Rishi Patialvi (Bam Dev Sharma) Rishi (1917–1999)
 Jagan Nath Azad (1918–2004)
 Kaifi Azmi (1918–2002)
 Fikr Taunsvi (1918-1987)
 Naeem Hashmi (1919–1976)
 Majrooh Sultanpuri (1919–2000)
 Khumar Barabankvi, Khumar (1919–1999)
 Qateel Shifai, Qateel (1919–2001)
 Masud Husain Khan (1919–2010)

1920
 Salaam Machhalishahari, Salaam (1921–1972)
 Sahir Ludhianvi, Sahir (1921–1980)
 Krishan Mohan, Krishan Lal Krishan Mohan (1922–2004)
 Wazir Agha (1922–2010)
 Sulaiman Areeb (1922–1970)
 Nazish Pratapgarhi, Nazish (1924–1981)
 Ada Jafri (1924–)
 Nasir Kazmi, Nasir (1925–1972)
 Bekas Akbarabadi, M.G Gupta wrote Urdu anthology, Rahat-i-Ruh (2004),(1925–2011)
 Rahi Masoom Raza (1925–1992)
 Himayat Ali Shair, Shair (1926)
 Kanwal Ziai Hardayal Singh Datta (1927–2012)
 Naresh Kumar Shad (1927–1969)
 Ibn-e-Insha, Insha (1927–1978)
 Bekal Utsahi (1928–2016)
 Sagar Siddiqui (1928–1974)
 Raja Mehdi Ali Khan (1928–1966)
 Habib Jalib (1928–1993)
 Dilawar Figar (1928–1998)
 Munir Niazi (1928–2006) 
 Shabnam Romani, Shabnam (1928–2009)
 Mazhar Imam (1928–2012)
 Wasif Ali Wasif (1929–1993)
 Dilawar Figar (1929-1998)

1930
 Mustafa Zaidi (1930–1970)
 Harbans Bhalla (1930–1993)
 Ahmad Faraz (1931–2008)
 Jon Elia (1931–2003)
 Rajendar Nath Rehbar (1931)
 Satyapal Anand (1931)
 Syed Amin Ashraf (1931)
 Shakeb Jalali (1932–1966)
 Rajinder Manchanda Bani Bani (1932–1981)
 Mohsin Bhopali (1932–2007)
 Sardar Panchhi (1932)
 Muzaffar Warsi (1933–2011)
 Syed Waheed Ashraf (1933)
 Waheed Akhtar (1934–1996)
 Sudarshan Faakir (1934–2008)
 Murtaza Birlas (1934)
 Mohsin Zaidi (1935–2003)
 Anwar Masood (1935)
 Aftab Iqbal Shamim (1936)
 Adil Mansuri (1936–2009)
 Akhlaq Mohammed Khan (Shahryar) (1936–2012)
 Gulzar (1936)
 Shahzad A. Rizvi (1937)
 Unwan Chishti Iftikharul Hasan Unwan (1937–2004)
 Nida Fazli (1938-2016)
 Makhmoor Saeedi (1938–2010)
 Syed Mahmood Khundmiri (1938–2011)
 Obaidullah Aleem (1939–1997)
 Allama Talib Jauhari (1939– )

1940
 Mahmood Shaam (1940)
 Kishwar Naheed (1940)
 Jazib Qureshi (1940)
 Riaz Ahmed Gohar Shahi (1941)
 Ahfaz ur Rahman (1942)
 Iftikhar Arif (1943)
 Shamim Farooqui (1943–2014)
 Amjad Islam Amjad (1944)
 Ghulam Muhammad Qasir, Qasir (1944–1999)
 Bashir Badr (1945)
 Javed Akhtar (1945)
 Anwer Zahidi (1946)
 Afzal Ahmed Syed (1946)
 Shamim Hashimi (1947)
 Saleem Kausar (1947)
 Mohsin Naqvi (1947-1996)
 Syed Ali Akhtar Rizvi, Sha'oor(1948–2002)
 Muhammad Izhar ul Haq (1948)
 Fehmida Riaz (1948)
 Pir Naseer-uddin-Naseer (1949–2009)
Zameer Akhtar Naqvi (1944-2020)

1950
 Rahat Indori (1950–2020)
 Zahid Abrol (1950)
 Jamal Ehsani (1951–1998)
 Ashfaq Hussain (1951–)
 Haider Qureshi (1952–)
 Munawwar Rana (1952–)
 Parveen Shakir (1952–1994)
 Abdul Hamid (1953–)
 Sara Shagufta (1954–1984)
 Kazim Jarwali (1955–)
 Sibt-e-Jaafar Zaidi (1957-2013)
 Noon Meem Danish (1958–)
 Salma Shaheen (1954)

1960
 Fareed Parbati (1961)
 Samina Raja (1961)
 Anjum Rehbar (1962)
 Zahida Hina (1962–)
 Raees Warsi (1963)
 Zulfiqar Naqvi (1965)
 Harris Khalique (1966)
 Idris Azad (1969)
 Riaz Tasneem (1969)

1970
 Irshad Kamil (1971)
Akhtar Raza Saleemi (1974)
 Ali Akbar Natiq (1974) 
 Irfan Nasirabadi (1975)
 Sarim Momin (1978)

Non-Muslim Urdu poets
 Meera, Mira Bai (c. 1498)
 Maharaja Chandu Lal Sadan (1766 – 1845)
 Mah Laqa Bai (1768-1824)
 Daya Shankar Kaul Nasim (1811–1845)
 Maharaja Sir Kishen Pershad, Shad (1864-1940)
 Brij Mohan Dattatreya Kaifi (1866 – 1955)
 Brij Narayan Chakbast (1882–1926)
 Tilok Chand Mehroom (1887–1966)
 Firaq Gorakhpuri (Raghupati Sahay) Firaq (1896–1982)
 Ram Prasad Bismil (1897–1927)
 Pandit Harichand Akhtar ('Akhtar') (1901–1958)
 Anand Narain Mulla (1901–1997)
 Khushtar Girami (Dewan Ram Rakhamal Kalia) (1902–1988)
 Gopal Mittal (1906–1993)
 Ratan Pandoravi (Rala Ram) Ratan (1907–1998)
 Arsh Malsiani (Bal Mukund) (1908–1979)
 Sahir Hoshiarpuri (1913–1994)
 Mehr Lal Soni Zia Fatehabadi (1913–1986)
 Rishi Patialvi (Bam Dev Sharma) Rishi (1917–1999)
 Jagan Nath Azad (1918–2004)
 Bhupendra Nath Kaushik (1924 – 2007)
 Krishna Kumar Sharma (1924–2001)
 Kanwal Ziai Hardayal Singh Datta (1927–2012)
 Naresh Kumar Shad (1927–1969)
 Harbans Bhalla (1930–1993)
 Satyapal Anand (1931)
 Raj Pathria (1933)
 Dushyant Kumar (1933–1975)
 Rajendar Nath Rehbar (1931)
 Sudarshan Faakir (1934–2008)
 Mohinder Pratap Chand (1935)
 Jayant Parmer (1954)

20th century 
 Mashal Sultanpuri (1937 – October 2020)
 Meena Kumari (1 August 1933 - 31 March 1972)

Contemporary poets
 Fuzail Ahmad Nasiri (b. 1978)

Poets with unknown dates of birth
 Saleem Kausar,
 Shahin Badar,
 Siraj Aurangabadi,
 Ziauddin Ahmad,
 Sadhu Singh Hamdard
 Qamar Jalalabadi 
 Kanwal Ziai

Contemporary poets with unknown dates of birth
 Kaif Bhopali
 Sayeed Quadri
 Khalid Irfan
 Kashmiri Lal Zakir

See also
 List of Pakistani poets
 List of Urdu-language writers

References

Lists of poets by language
Poets